Estancia Cristina is an Argentine estancia located inside Los Glaciares National Park in Santa Cruz Province. Founded in 1914 by Joseph Percival Masters, an Englishman who had come to Patagonia with his wife in 1900, Estancia Cristina was named in honor of Master's daughter Cristina.

Located on the coast of Brazo Cristina, a northern channel of Argentino Lake, Estancia Cristina still keeps the history of the Masters family alive. Its lodge continues to operate, offering Patagonian hospitality in 20 rooms distributed over five buildings.

External links
Official site (English/Spanish)
Viva Patagonia(English/Spanish)

Buildings and structures in Santa Cruz Province, Argentina